Mordellistena chrysotrichia is a beetle in the genus Mordellistena of the family Mordellidae. It was described in 1951 by Nomura.

References

chrysotrichia
Beetles described in 1951